From A to B is the debut album from New Musik released on 18 April 1980. The CD version was first released on the GTO label in 1994 with three bonus tracks. A digitally remastered version called From A To B...Plus was released in 2000 and contained six bonus tracks.

Track listing

LP: GTLP 041

From A
"Straight Lines" – 5:12
"Sanctuary" – 4:12
"A Map Of You" – 3:50
"Science" – 3:20
"On Islands" – 4:24

To B
"This World Of Water" – 3:37
"Living by Numbers" – 3:28
"Dead Fish (Don't Swim Home)" – 5:24
"Adventures" – 3:52
"The Safe Side" – 3:09

1994 - GTO Records CD: GTO 474616-2
"Straight Lines" – 5:12
"Sanctuary" – 4:12
"A Map Of You" – 3:50
"Science" – 3:20
"On Islands" – 4:24
"This World Of Water" – 3:37
"Living By Numbers" – 3:28
"Dead Fish (Don't Swim Home)" – 5:24
"Adventures" – 3:52
"The Safe Side" – 3:09
"Missing Persons" – 5:40
"She's A Magazine" – 4:16
"Sad Films" – 2:41

Edsel 2000 CD Remaster (EDCD 678)
"Straight Lines" – 5:12
"Sanctuary" – 4:12
"A Map Of You" – 3:50
"Science" – 3:20
"On Islands" – 4:24
"This World Of Water" – 3:37
"Living By Numbers" – 3:28
"Dead Fish (Don't Swim Home)" – 5:24
"Adventures" – 3:52
"The Safe Side" – 3:09
"Sad Films" – 2:41
"Missing Persons" – 5:45
"Tell Me Something New" – 2:09
"She's A Magazine" – 4:21
"Chik Musik" – 2:47
"Magazine Musik" – 1:02

Personnel
New Musik
 Tony Mansfield – vocals, guitars, keyboards
 Tony Hibbert – bass
 Clive Gates – keyboards
 Phil Towner – drums, percussion
Technical
 Produced By Tony Mansfield
 Recorded At TMC Studios
Chief Engineer Peter Hammond

References

New Musik albums
1980 debut albums
GTO Records albums